Sam Lewis Underwood (born 4 August 1987) is an English actor who portrayed the twins Luke and Mark Gray in the Fox thriller drama The Following, Jake Otto in the AMC series Fear the Walking Dead (2017), and Adam Carrington in The CW series Dynasty (2019–2022)

Early life and education
Underwood was born in Woking, Surrey and attended the Winston Churchill School. He trained at the Karen Clarke Theatre Group (now Summerscales Performing Arts), was taught by vocal coach Phil Wisdom and attended Songtime Theatre Arts.

He moved to the United States in October 2006 where he studied at the American Musical and Dramatic Academy in New York. He graduated in February 2008.

He co-founded the Fundamental Theater Project in New York with Nicola Murphy in April 2010.

Career
While appearing as Marchbanks in George Bernard Shaw's Candida at the Irish Repertory Theatre, New York, in April 2010, Underwood was asked to play the part of Alan Strang in a production of Equus at the John Drew Theater at Guild Hall of East Hampton, co-starring alongside Alec Baldwin.

In 2013, Underwood was cast in the eighth season of television series Dexter in the recurring role of Zach Hamilton, Dexter Morgan's "protégé". He subsequently joined the third season of Homeland as Leo Carras.

Beginning in February 2014, Underwood took on the dual roles of twins Mark and Luke Gray in the second season of the Fox murder mystery The Following. But after the death of Luke, he was left playing Mark - who had split identities - in its third and final season.

As of 2017, Underwood joined the cast of the hit AMC thriller series Fear the Walking Dead in its third season as Jake Otto, the enigmatic son of the colony leader.

In 2019, Underwood was cast as Adam Carrington in The CW television series Dynasty, a reboot of the 1980s series of the same name.

Personal life 
Underwood married actress Valorie Curry in July 2016.

Filmography

Television

Film

Theatre

References

External links

Living people
English male television actors
English expatriates in the United States
1987 births
People from Woking
21st-century English male actors
Male actors from Surrey
English male film actors
English male stage actors